Warning light may refer to:

 Aircraft warning lights, a device used on radio masts and towers and other tall structures to prevent collisions
 Idiot light, an indicator of malfunction of a system within a motor vehicle, especially if used to replace a gauge
 Check engine light, to indicate malfunction of a computerized engine management system
Warning Light, an American ambient music project